Suspense is a feeling of uncertainty and anxiety about the outcome of certain actions.

Suspense may also refer to:

 Suspense (1913 film), a silent film
 Suspense (1930 film), a film featuring Walter Summers
 Suspense (1946 film), a film starring Barry Sullivan
 Suspense (radio drama), an American radio anthology series
 Suspense (American TV series), an American television anthology series
 Suspense (British TV series), a British television anthology series
 Suspense (album), a 1984 album by Pink Lady
 Suspense Digest, an Urdu magazine in Pakistan

See also
 Suspense account, a type of temporary account in accounting
 Suspension (disambiguation)
 Thriller (genre)